Kürdçü (also, Kurtchu, Kyurkchili, and Mirizali) is a village in the Hajigabul Rayon of Azerbaijan.  The village forms part of the municipality of Atbulaq.

References 

Populated places in Hajigabul District